Errington Ridley Liddell Keen (4 October 1910 – July 1984) was an English football player and manager. Keen played at both professional and international levels, before becoming a coach at both national and international level in Europe and Africa.

Career

Playing career
Born in Walker, Newcastle upon Tyne, Keen, who played as a left half, played club football for Newcastle Schools, Nun's Moor, Newcastle Swifts, Newcastle United, Derby County, Chelmsford City, Hereford United, Leeds United and Bacup Borough.

He also earned four caps for England between 1932 and 1936. Making his debut in a friendly match against Austria on 7 December 1932.

Coaching career
Keen was player-manager of Hereford United between 1939 and 1940.

Keen managed Egypt between 1947 and 1948, and was in charge at the 1948 Summer Olympics.

Keen later managed Hong Kong in 1948, Swedish club side IFK Norrköping and Turkish club side Beşiktaş between 1949 and 1950.

Later life
Keen died in July 1984.

References

English footballers
England international footballers
English football managers
Newcastle United F.C. players
Derby County F.C. players
Chelmsford City F.C. players
Hereford United F.C. players
Leeds United F.C. players
Bacup Borough F.C. players
English Football League players
Hereford United F.C. managers
IFK Norrköping managers
1910 births
1984 deaths
English Football League representative players
Egypt national football team managers
Hong Kong national football team managers
English expatriate football managers
English expatriate sportspeople in Egypt
Expatriate football managers in Egypt
Expatriate football managers in Hong Kong
English expatriate sportspeople in Sweden
Expatriate football managers in Sweden
English expatriate sportspeople in Turkey
Expatriate football managers in Turkey
Beşiktaş J.K. managers
Association football midfielders
English expatriate sportspeople in Hong Kong
Expatriate footballers in Hong Kong
English expatriate footballers